White Shadow is a 2013 internationally co-produced drama film written, produced and directed by Noaz Deshe. An international co-production between Germany, Italy and Tanzania, the film premiered in Critics’ Week selection at the 70th Venice International Film Festival on September 2, 2013. It won the Lion of the future award at the festival.	

The film later premiered in-competition in the World Cinema Dramatic Competition at 2014 Sundance Film Festival on January 17, 2014. The film also screened at 2014 San Francisco International Film Festival on May 4, 2014. Ryan Gosling along with Matteo Ceccarini and Eva Riccobono served as the executive producers of the film.

Plot
Alias, a young Albino, is on the run from the local doctors, who are hunting Albinos to use their body parts for potions.

Cast
Hamisi Bazili as Alias
James Gayo as Kosmos
Glory Mbayuwayu as Antoinette
Salum Abdallah as Salum
Riziki Ally as Mother
John S. Mwakipunda as Anulla
Tito D. Ntanga	as Father
James P. Salala as Adin

Reception
White Shadow received mostly positive reviews from critics. Guy Lodge of Variety, said in his review that "Noaz Deshe makes a staggering debut with this drama about the African albino multi trade." Boyd van Hoeij in his review for The Hollywood Reporter said that "This harrowing account of a young albino's fight for survival in Tanzania is too long but nonetheless often gripping." Jessica Kiang of Indiewire grade the film B+ and praised the film by saying that "We have to admit, it first took a lot of our patience, and then all of our nerve, to make it through to the end, but that simply makes it a film that is exactly as upsetting as its subject matter warrants."

Accolades

References

External links
 Official website
 Official website
 
 

2013 films
German drama films
Italian drama films
2013 drama films
Albinism in popular culture
Tanzanian drama films
2010s German films